Cannabis in Arkansas is illegal for recreational use. Medical use was legalized in 2016 by way of a ballot measure to amend the state constitution.

Prohibition
Cannabis was criminalized in Arkansas in 1923; New Mexico, Nevada, Oregon, and Washington also banned cannabis in that year.

Legal penalties
The possession of under  of cannabis is a Class A misdemeanor under state law, carrying a fine of up to $2,500 and up to one year imprisonment.

As Arkansas is a "Smoke a joint, lose your license" state, any conviction for a cannabis offense is punished with a mandatory six month driver's license suspension.

Reforms

Failed medical cannabis initiative (2012)
In 2012, the Arkansas Medical Marijuana Act (Issue 5) qualified for vote on the statewide ballot. The act would have allowed non-profit organizations to grow and sell medical cannabis and additionally permitted patients who live over five miles from a legal dispensary to cultivate a small number of plants on their own property.  The act was defeated by a vote of 48.6% to 51.4%.

Medical cannabis legalized (2016)
On November 8, 2016, Arkansas voters approved Issue 6, the Arkansas Medical Marijuana Amendment, to legalize the medical use of cannabis.  A separate measure, the Arkansas Medical Cannabis Act (Issue 7), was disqualified from the ballot 12 days before the election by the Arkansas Supreme Court.

The Arkansas Medical Marijuana Amendment passed by a vote of 53%–47% as an amendment to the state constitution. It also requires that between 20 and 40 cannabis dispensaries and 4 to 8 cultivators be licensed by the state. No allowance was made for patients to cultivate at home.

Licensed sales did not begin until May 2019 when the first dispensary opened in Hot Springs.  The dispensary was one of 32 initially licensed by the state along with 5 cultivators.

Failed recreational cannabis initiative (2022)
On September 22, 2022, the Supreme Court of Arkansas ruled that Issue 4, the Marijuana Legalization Initiative, was valid for the November 2022 ballot after it was initially blocked by the Board of Election Commissioners. If approved, the initiative would have: 

 allowed the possession of up to one ounce of cannabis for adults 21 and over
 allowed the sale of cannabis at dispensaries licensed by the state
 not allowed for any home cultivation
 allowed the state to impose a 10% tax on recreational cannabis sales, in addition to existing state and local sales taxes
 divided tax revenue up between law enforcement (15 percent), the University of Arkansas for Medical Sciences (10 percent), and the state drug court program (5 percent), with the remainder going to the state general fund

The initiative failed with 44% of the vote on November 8, 2022, however.

Municipal reforms
In 2006, Eureka Springs residents voted 64%–36% to make enforcement of cannabis laws the lowest police priority.  Fayetteville residents approved a similar initiative in 2008 by a 62%–38% margin.  However, a 2019 report by the Arkansas Justice Collective found that cannabis arrests actually increased by 44% in Fayetteville since the measure passed.

In 2021, the Little Rock Board of Directors voted 7–3 to require that "investigations, citations, arrests, property seizures, etc. for adult misdemeanor marijuana offenses" be made the lowest law enforcement and prosecutorial priority when the amount of cannabis is deemed to be for personal use.

References